Emmanuel Graf von Mensdorff-Pouilly (24 January 1777 – 28 June 1852) was an army officer in the Imperial-Royal Army of the Austrian Empire, and vice-governor of Mainz. He was the uncle of Queen Victoria and the godfather of her husband, Prince Albert of Saxe-Coburg and Gotha.

Life and career 
The Mensdorff-Pouilly family originated from the barony of Pouilly in Stenay, on the river Meuse in Lorraine. Albert-Louis, Baron de Pouilly et de Chaffour, Comte de Roussy (1731–1795) and his wife, Marie Antoinette de Custine (1746–1800) emigrated together with their children during the French Revolution. Their sons, Albert (1775–1799) and Emmanuel (baptised at Nancy on 24 January 1777), took the name Mensdorff from a community in the county of Roussy, Luxembourg.

The brothers entered military service against revolutionary and Napoleonic France, and Albert was killed in battle in 1799. At the start of the War of the Fifth Coalition, Emmanuel held the rank of major. On 13 April 1809, he was wounded while leading a company of the 8th Jäger in action near Amberg. By 23 April, he had recovered enough to partake in the cavalry battles at the start of the Battle of Ratisbon. He was decorated with the Military Order of Maria Theresa for his services in the war.

In 1810, he was given command of the Galician regiment of Uhlans „Erzherzog Carl“ Nr. 3. Serving as a commander of a cavalry brigade in Bohemia, Mensdorff-Pouilly became commander of the Fortress of Mainz. From 1829 to 1834, Mensdorff-Pouilly also served as vice-governor of Mainz.

After again having served in Bohemia, Mensdorff-Pouilly became vice-president of the Hofkriegsrat in 1840. He retired from the army in 1848 with the rank of feldmarschallleutnant. During the Revolutions of 1848, Mensdorff-Pouilly was sent as a commissioner to Prague, where he tried in vain to impress on the Prince of Windisch-Grätz the necessity to avoid bloodshed.

Family
Emmanuel von Mensdorff-Pouilly married Princess Sophie of Saxe-Coburg-Saalfeld, daughter of Francis, Duke of Saxe-Coburg-Saalfeld, on 22 February 1804 at Coburg. Through this marriage, he was the brother-in-law of King Leopold I of Belgium and the uncle of both Queen Victoria and Prince Albert of the United Kingdom, and of King Ferdinand II of Portugal.

Emmanuel and Sophie had six sons:
 Hugo Ferdinand (1806–1847)
 Alphons (1810–1894), Count von Mensdorff-Pouilly, ∞ 1. 1843 Countess Therese von Dietrichstein-Proskau-Leslie (1823–1856), ∞ 2. 1862 Countess Maria Thersia von Lamberg (1833–1876).
 Alfred Carl (1812–1814).
 Alexander (1813–1871), Fürst von Dietrichstein zu Nikolsburg (1868), was Austrian Foreign Minister and Prime Minister of Austria in the 1860s, ∞ 1857 Countess Alexandrine Maria von Dietrichstein-Proskau-Leslie (1824–1906)
 Leopold Emanuel (1815–1832)
 Arthur August (1817–1904), ∞ 1. 1853 (div. 1882) Magdalene Kremzow (1835–1899), ∞ 2. 1902 Countess Bianca Albertina von Wickenburg (1837–1912)

Emmanuel was created Graf (Count) von Mensdorff-Pouilly on 29 November 1818 in Vienna. In 1838, he purchased Schloss Preitenstein in the Plzeň Region of Bohemia, which remained the property of the Mensdorff-Pouilly family until 1945.

Honours
He received the following orders and decorations:

References

Literature
Eddie de Tassigny: Les Mensdorff-Pouilly. Le destin d'une famille émigrée en 1790. Paris: Le Bois d’Hélène, 1998.

1777 births
1852 deaths
People from Lorraine
Austrian generals
Emmanuel
Knights Cross of the Military Order of Maria Theresa
Recipients of the Pour le Mérite (military class)
Recipients of the Order of St. George of the Fourth Degree
Recipients of the Order of St. Anna, 2nd class
Recipients of the Order of St. Vladimir, 3rd class
Recipients of the Order of the White Eagle (Russia)
Honorary Knights Grand Cross of the Order of the Bath